The Community Relations Service (CRS) is part of the United States Department of Justice. The office is intended to act as a peacemaker "for community conflicts and tensions arising from differences of race, color, national origin, gender, gender identity, sexual orientation, religion and disability." It was created by the Civil Rights Act of 1964, and its mission was broadened by the Matthew Shepard and James Byrd Jr. Hate Crimes Prevention Act. Originally under the Department of Commerce, it was moved to the Department of Justice by order of President Johnson.

It is "the only Federal agency dedicated to assist State and local units of government, private and public organizations, and community groups with preventing and resolving racial and ethnic tensions, incidents, and civil disorders, and in restoring racial stability and harmony" by employing conciliators.

The current director is Paul Monteiro, who was appointed by the Biden Administration and sworn in on May 26, 2022.

References

United States Department of Justice agencies